Olequa, also known as Olequah, is an unincorporated community in Cowlitz County, Washington. Olequa is located north of the city of Castle Rock on the west bank of the Cowlitz River. The Olequa community is part of the Castle Rock School District, a K-12 school district of about 1,300 students.

A post office called Olequa was established in 1875, and remained in operation until 1912. Olequa is a name derived from an Indian language.

Geography
Olequa is located at  (46.37524765, -122.9403952).

External links
Castle Rock School District website

References

Unincorporated communities in Cowlitz County, Washington
Unincorporated communities in Washington (state)